Nuremberg Airport , , is the international airport of the Franconian metropolitan area of Nuremberg and the second-busiest airport in Bavaria after Munich Airport. The year 2018, with 4.5 million, was the year with the highest passenger volume ever at this airport. It is Germany's 9th busiest airport in 2022. It is located approximately 5 km north of Nuremberg's city centre and offers flights within Germany as well as to European metropolitan and leisure destinations, especially along the Mediterranean Sea, on the Canary Islands and in Egypt.

History

Before the current airport
Prior to World War II, the Nuremberg area was served by a number of airfields in quick succession, all of which became inadequate in the face of the rapid development of aviation or fell victim to the same wars that had played a part in their construction. The first airfield in the area was built in 1915 by the Bavarian Army in the neighboring town of Fürth as a military air base. This Old Atzenhof Airport  (Fürth Airfield) remained in civilian use throughout the Weimar Republic until the new Nazi government opened the new Marienberg Airport in Nuremberg. Largely destroyed in the war, the site of the former Marienberg airport today is a public park. The former Atzenhof airfield was taken over by the US Army after the war and is today used as a golf course with some of the erstwhile airport buildings still extant. Being thus left without a "proper" usable civilian airport - from 1950 to the completion of the new permanent airport passenger flights serving the area had to land at a private airfield of a Fürth based company near the current endpoint of the U1 subway line, Fürth Hardhöhe station (A small plaque in the access tunnel to the subway station reminds of that history) - the need to build an airport equipped for the demands of the rapidly growing aviation sector became pressing and the young Federal Republic of Germany engaged in the first airport building project of its existence.

Early years

Nuremberg Airport was the first airport constructed in Germany after World War II. It was inaugurated on 6 April 1955.

In 1960, the number of passengers at Nuremberg Airport reached 100,000 for the first time. On 12 July 1970, a Boeing 747 landed at the airport for the first time and attracted 20,000 visitors.

The apron was enlarged in 1977 and in 1981 a new passenger terminal with an observation deck and a restaurant replaced the previous building. In December 1986, the one million passenger mark was passed for the first time.

Development from the 1990s
In 1997/98, Air Berlin established a winter hub at the airport, making it the airline's second most important tourist interchange airport, after Palma de Mallorca.

The new control tower commenced operations in 1999 and the metro station was opened.  In 2005 Nuremberg Airport celebrated its 50th anniversary with 45,000 visitors.

Nuremberg Airport has been voted "Best German Airport" by readers of the Business Traveller magazine consecutively since 2008.

In April 2013 Air Berlin permanently shut down its winter seasonal hub in Nuremberg which had been maintained for several years.

In December 2014 the airport was named after Albrecht Dürer, who was born in Nuremberg. Subsequently the subway station was adorned with reproductions of Dürer works.

In October 2016, Ryanair announced it would open a base at Nuremberg Airport consisting of two aircraft while four additional routes were inaugurated. In the same month, Air Berlin announced it would close its maintenance facilities at the airport due to cost cutting and restructuring measures. Shortly after, Germania announced it would open a new base at Nuremberg Airport consisting of one aircraft which served several new leisure routes. 2017 saw the bankruptcy of Air Berlin ending a trend of Air Berlin withdrawing service from the airport with the grounding of all Air Berlin flights. In January 2018, Eurowings announced it would establish a base at the airport consisting of one aircraft and four new routes as well as increased frequencies. After the demise of Germania in early 2019, TUI fly Deutschland announced it would base aircraft in Nuremberg to take over several leisure destinations. In late 2019 Ryanair announced the closure of their base in Nuremberg effective with the end of the winter schedule. Also in 2019 Corendon airlines announced a new base at NUE with over 50 weekly departures in the summer season. The company further expressed their commitment to the region with a special aircraft livery Boeing 737-800 honoring local association football team 1. FC Nürnberg with whom they entered a partnership in 2020.

In June 2021, Lufthansa announced the termination of its route to Munich Airport, a flight covering around 170 km taking less than 30 minutes, in the wake of the Covid-19 pandemic and after facing longstanding criticism from an environmental standpoint. It has been replaced by a coach service which however lacks usage by customers. During the same time, flights via other hubs than Munich registered increased passenger numbers.

In August 2021, the airport announced plans to build another cargo center with 3600 m² of hangar space and 1900 m² of office space, with completion scheduled for 2023.

Facilities

Runway
Takeoff and landing of all current aircraft, including widebody aircraft (e.g. Boeing 747) or cargo planes (e.g. Antonov An-124 Ruslan) are possible. However, Nuremberg Airport is not licensed for the Airbus A380. Starting in July 2009, the runway was refurbished gradually in several phases. The surfaces of the runway and taxiways were renovated using the latest technology. A new flare-path, drainage channels and a new electric ring surrounding the entire runway were added. In 2010, the runway was shortened to  temporarily to allow construction to continue. In 2011, work on the centerpiece of the runway began. The work was completed in 2015.

Terminal
The passenger terminal consists of two departure halls and one arrival hall which are all linked landside and airside. The check-in area features 40 desks. In December 2015 the new security control between departure halls 1 and 2 on the ground floor opened, replacing earlier facilities upstairs in hall 2 as machines had gotten too heavy.

The extension of departure hall 2 was inaugurated on 30 April 1992 and was originally dimensioned for 2.8 million passengers per year. Now there is room for 5 million passengers per year. Daylight dominates the transparent construction made of steel and glass drafted by Nuremberg architects Grabow and Hoffmann. The construction phase took three years and cost about 100 million Deutsche Mark. The extension of the apron was included in the building costs as well as three modern air bridges. Today, there are four finger docks available.

On 25 January 2007 the newest addition, the Transfer-Control-Terminal (TCT) was opened. It not only serves as a capacity extension but it also allows for new legislation concerning security measures: since EU Regulation 2320/2002 airports have to make sure that non-EU passengers are controlled before continuing their trip to countries of the European Union and don't get mixed up with passengers who have already been checked. There is a second security control for the stricter security procedures for flights to Israel inside the TCT when flights to Israel operate.

Cargo center
In 1987, Cargo Center Nuremberg  (CCN) was put into operation. When the Cold War ended and after the collapse of the Soviet Union, Nuremberg won back its central location in Europe. As a consequence Nuremberg Airport and air freight quickly gained in importance in the 1990s.

Nuremberg is also the economic and service metropolis of Franconia with approximately 150,000 companies and enterprises taking advantage of the locality of Nuremberg as a traffic junction of highways and railroads. The region's export share of 42% is remarkably high and above German average. In addition, several headquarters of internationally operating companies are located in the region, for example Siemens, Adidas, Bosch, Puma and Faber-Castell.

Due to the positive trend, Cargo Center II (CCN II) was built in 2003.

Control tower
Deutsche Flugsicherung (DFS), which is in charge of air traffic control in Germany, moved into the  tower in November 1998. The control tower at Nuremberg Airport was designed by architect Günther Behnisch and has become the architectural landmark of the airport with its dynamic silhouette. It was built because the original control tower was only 18 meters high.  The project cost approximately 30 million Deutsche Mark.

Parking
There are about 8,000 car parking spaces at Nuremberg Airport. Apart from three car parks, there are various parking lots in close vicinity to the terminals. The newest facility is car park P3 with seven levels and 2,200 parking spaces.
There are different tariffs to choose from, for example "BusinessParken" (business parking) or "UrlauberParken" (holiday parking). Nuremberg Airport also offers valet parking with additional services, like refueling, car wash, maintenance or safekeeping of valuables. As of 2019 another multistorey car parking structure is being built east of the existing ones, closer to the main access road. All parking facilities are no more 5 minutes' walking distance from the terminals. There are short-term parking spots directly on the airport forecourt in front of the terminals.

Air rescue
Nuremberg Airport is also a center for  Deutsche Rettungsflugwacht e.V  (DRF) and HDM Flugservice air rescue services which operate a rescue helicopter and an intensive care helicopter, respectively.
Furthermore, several ADAC air ambulances and Flight Ambulance International (FAI) are based in Nuremberg.

Airlines and destinations
The following airlines operate regular scheduled and charter flights at Nuremberg Airport:

Annual Traffic

Ground transportation

Metro

The U-Bahn (Metro) line U2 serves the airport at the Flughafen station. Trains connect the airport with the centre of the city every 10 minutes. The ride to the Hauptbahnhof (Central Railway Station) and the nearby Altstadt (historic old town) only takes 13 minutes. Nuremberg Airport is the only airport in Germany to be served by U-Bahn rather than S-Bahn, Tramway or Deutsche Bahn.

Car
It is accessible via nearby Autobahn A 3, which connects to Autobahn A 9 as well as Motorways A 73 and A 6. Longstanding plans for a more direct access from A3 (which runs north of the runway) were abandoned by all relevant local political factions in the run-up to the 2020 local elections. Bundesstraße 4 runs just to the West of the runway and is connected to the airport by local roads. Access for private automobiles is via Marienbergstraße and Flughafenstraße whereas public transit buses can use a slightly more direct route (see below).

Bus
Bus number 30 connects the airport with bus and Tram line 4 stop "am Wegfeld" before continuing to Erlangen. Since December 2015 new bus line 33 was installed, allowing passengers from Nuremberg's west-neighbouring city Fürth getting to the airport quicker without taking a detour via Nuremberg Central Station. Since the extension of Tram Line 4 from Thon to am Wegfeld, Bus line 30 which formerly terminated in Thon has been rerouted to the airport, thus offering a direct connection to downtown Erlangen from the airport for the first time. The bus takes a route through local neighborhoods which predate the airport and makes use of streets which are otherwise closed to motorized traffic, including a short stretch through the airport parking lot. During much of the day lines 30 and 33 overlap between "am Wegfeld" and the airport for a ten minute headway.

Walking or cycling
Because of the airport's close-in location and its direct connections to local streets, it is also possible to walk or ride a bicycle from nearby neighborhoods right up to the terminal. Consequently, there is also bicycle parking in front of the terminal which is used by both employees and passengers.

Environment
In addition to developing strategies to reduce noise pollution the department also implements regular measurements of air pollutants and soil analyses. In 2003, a biomonitoring campaign with honey bees was launched at the airport.

The water collected on the 70 ha of sealed or covered areas is being filtered and analyzed before it gets fed into receiving water courses, to prevent pollution due to oils or fuels. If the analyzed TOC value is above the threshold level, the water is discharged into the sewerage. Over the years, surface and aircraft de-icing fluids have been replaced by substances with higher biodegradability.

In 2019 the airport replaced its baggage tug fleets with all electric vehicles

The airport uses solar panels on some rooftops and woodchips provided by local agricultural producers to provide 100% renewable electricity

Expansion plans

Airport Business Center
In 2009, it was decided that a new hotel with conference rooms and offices will be built at the airport roundabout. ConTech GmbH and the architect's office Christ, both from Nuremberg, will realize the project with investor ZBI. In 2011 the plans were put on hold until the motorway connection is completed.

Motorway access
Direct access to motorway A3 has been planned for several years. A direct route to the airport with a tunnel under the runway to reduce traffic through city district Ziegelstein is favored and spatial planning has already been completed. However, further planning has been delayed as environmental organization Bund Naturschutz and alliance Nein zur Flughafen-Nordanbindung! are vehemently against the plans. While the decision to construct motorway access is ultimately taken at the federal level, ahead of the 2020 mayoral elections candidates of CSU, SPD and Greens have all voiced their opposition to the plans of constructing such a road.

Cargo Center Nuremberg 3 (CCN3)
In 2021, a letter of intend was signed for another cargo center (CCN3). The CCN3 will add around 3,600 sqm of warehouse space and around 1,900 sqm of office space to the range of services.

Accidents and incidents
 On 8 January 2010, an Air Berlin Boeing 737-800 skidded off the runway shortly before takeoff on a flight to Düsseldorf, causing the airport to close for a few hours.

See also
 List of airports in Germany
 Transport in Germany

References

Citations

Bibliography
 Bernd Windsheimer: 50 Jahre Airport Nürnberg 1955–2005. Geschichte der Luftfahrt in Nürnberg, Nürnberg 2005

External links

 Official website
 
 

Transport in Nuremberg
Airports in Bavaria
Companies based in Nuremberg
Buildings and structures in Bavaria